Nojorid is a large commune located in Bihor County, Crișana, Romania. It is composed of seven villages: Apateu (Oláhapáti), Chișirid (Kisürögd), Leș (Váradles), Livada de Bihor (Mácsapuszta), Nojorid, Păușa (Váradpósa) and Șauaieu (Biharsályi).

References

Communes in Bihor County
Localities in Crișana